Clarkeinda trachodes is a poisonous mushroom in the family Agaricaceae. This agaric species is only distributed in South and Southeast Asia in countries such as Bangladesh, China, India, Indonesia, Malaysia, and Sri Lanka. It has both a partial and universal veil, and dark-colorer spores.

The official description of the species (as Agaricus trachodes) was first given by Miles Joseph Berkeley in 1847, from collections made in Sri Lanka. Rolf Singer transferred it to the genus Clarkeinda in 1951.

References

External links

Agaricaceae
Fungi of Asia
Fungi of Bangladesh
Fungi of India
Fungi of Sri Lanka
Fungi described in 1847
Taxa named by Miles Joseph Berkeley